The 2020 UCLA Bruins baseball team represented the University of California, Los Angeles in the 2020 NCAA Division I baseball season as a member of the Pac-12 Conference. The team was coached by John Savage and played their home games at Jackie Robinson Stadium.

The Bruins began the 2020 season with high hopes after the successes of the prior season, earning the #12 ranking from Collegiate Baseball (CB) and #8 ranking in the ESPN/USA Today Coaches Poll in preseason polls. These rankings proved accurate, as UCLA began the season on a 12-game win streak and earned the #1 ranking from CB in their Week 2 and 3 rankings. Due to the COVID-19 pandemic, the season was cut short in early March. On March 12, the NCAA announced all spring and winter sports championships were cancelled, and UCLA made the decision to suspend academic and athletic activities through the month of March on the same day. Also on March 12, the Pac-12 Conference cancelled all athletics until further notice.

Previous season
The Bruins finished 2019 with a 52–11 record, finishing first in the Pac-12 with a 24–5 record.  After earning the top overall seed for the 2019 NCAA Division I baseball tournament, the Bruins advanced to the Los Angeles Super Regional, where they were defeated two games to one by eventual national runner-up Michigan.

Personnel

Roster

Coaching staff

Schedule and results

Rankings

2020 MLB draft

References

UCLA
UCLA Bruins baseball seasons
UCLA Bruins baseball